The Aloft Liverpool Hotel, formerly the Royal Insurance Building, is a historic building located at 1-9 North John Street, Liverpool, Merseyside, England.  It was built as the head office of the Royal Insurance company.

History

The building was constructed between 1896 and 1903 as the head office of the Royal Insurance Company (Since 1996 part of the ″RSA Insurance Group″). The design was the result of a competition won by James F. Doyle in 1895.  The assessor for the competition was Norman Shaw, who was retained as an advisory architect for the project, but it is uncertain what part he played in it.  The building is constructed around a steel frame and is the earliest example of this type of construction in the United Kingdom.  It ceased to be used by the late 1980s, and its condition deteriorated so much that it was placed on the Buildings at Risk Register of English Heritage.

In 2013 its freehold was bought by Liverpool City Council, and it was converted it into a hotel. It opened as the Aloft Liverpool Hotel on 29 October 2014. At the 20 years of the register, the renovation of the Royal Insurance Building was named as one of the successful rescues.

Architecture

Constructed around a steel frame, the building is in Portland stone, with a granite basement and ground floor.  Its architecture is described as "sumptuous Neo-Baroque on the grandest scale".  The building is in four storeys with a basement and an attic.  Its long front on North John Street has eleven bays, with three bays on Dale Street.  The ground floor and basement are rusticated.  The windows are three-light sash windows with round heads.  Those on the first floor have Gibbs surrounds and iron balconies.  In the second and third floors the windows are recessed behind a Doric colonnade and entablature.  In the attic are dormers.  Some of these have architraves, keystones, and either segmental or triangular pediments; the others are flat-topped and contain casement windows.  The entrance is on the second bay from the left in North John Street.  The doorway has Doric columns and is round-headed.  The first floor contains a round-headed window surrounded by a portico with a broken segmental pediment containing carved figures.  Above this bay rises a three-stage campanile bearing an octagonal cupola with a gilded dome.  On the Dale Street façade is a Venetian window.  The second floor contains a frieze designed by C. J. Allen depicting themes relating to insurance.  At the corners of this front are octagonal turrets with cupolas and finials.  Between the turrets at attic level are three round-headed windows with rusticated Ionic pilasters, an entablature, and an iron balcony.

The interior contains the former General Office on the ground floor which, because of the steel frame, is free from any columns.  Above this, the former Board Room has a tunnel vault.  Both rooms are decorated with stucco in 17th-century style.  The building is recorded in the National Heritage List for England as a designated Grade II* listed building.

There is an earlier Royal Insurance Building, dating from 1839, in nearby Queen Avenue, also Grade II* listed.

See also

Grade II* listed buildings in Merseyside
Architecture of Liverpool

References

External links
Official website
Official chain website
Liverpool Architecture

Grade II* listed buildings in Liverpool
Edwardian architecture
Structures formerly on the Heritage at Risk register
Grade II* listed hotels